The Last Aristocrats is a 1989 Chinese drama film directed by Xie Jin and starring Pan Hong, Pu Cunxin, Li Kequn, and Xiao Xiong. It is base on the short story Zhexianji by Taiwanese novelist Bai Xianyong. The film picks up the story of the lives of four young Chinese girls, daughters of Shanghai's elite, who went to the United States to study in 1948 and faced difficulties trying to return home a year later. The film was released in South Korea on 23 December 1989.

Plot
In the spring of 1947 in Nanjing, Jiangsu, Li Tong (Pan Hong) spends her twentieth birthday in a happy atmosphere. She then pursues advanced studies in the United States with her friends Huang Huifen (Li Kequn), Lei Zhiling (Xiao Xiong) and Zhang Jiaxing (Lu Ling). The four young girls are daughters of Shanghai's elite. Li Tong's father (Wang Bing) is a diplomat in the Nationalist Government.

When the Communists take over Shanghai in 1948, Li Tong's parents dies in a storm on their way to Taiwan. Li Tong's boyfriend Chen Yin (Pu Cunxin), a graduate of Harvard University, finds a job as a lawyer. They celebrate the happy event in a restaurant. After hearing the tragic news, Li Tong becomes more and more melancholy. She quietly leaves and disappears without a trace.

Three years later, Li Tong appears at Zhang Jiaxing's wedding, her heavy make-up gives her friends mixed feelings.

Before long, Chen Yin learns by newspaper that Li Tong was arrested by the police due to drinking and rioting. Chen Yin goes to the police station to bail her out and takes her home. He tries to persuade her to cheer up, but she has lost her soul.

Another spring later, after traveling around the world, Li Tong arrives at her birthplace, Venice, and throws herself into the sea.

Cast
 Pan Hong as Li Tong
 Pu Cunxin as Chen Yin
 Li Kequn as Huang Huifen 
 Xiao Xiong as Lei Zhiling
 Lu Ling as Zhang Jiaxing
 Lisa Lu as Li Tong's mother
 Wang Bing as Li Tong's father
 Li Weixin as Huang Huifen's father
 Yan Meiyi as Huang Huifen's mother
 Yan Bide as Zhang Jiaxing's father
 Zhu Xijuan as Zhang Jiaxing's mother
 Ying Da as Zhou Daqing
 Mao Yongming as Doctor Wang, husband of Zhang Jiaxing 
 Ma Xiaofeng as Zhang Jiaxing's brother
 Marcelline Block as Christmas caroler
 Amy Yen-Lung Chen as Lily
 Amy Chow as Cashier
 Hong Tran as Dim Sum cook
 Lynn Ann Guisti as Distressed child 
 Alice Liu as Wife

Production
On April 26, 1987, Xie Jin and Pai Hsien-yung met at the West Lake in Hangzhou, Zhejiang, they talked about changing the short story Zhexianji into a movie. Brigitte Lin had been considered to star as Li Tong, the female lead role in the film, but at that time the relationship between the two sides of the Taiwan Strait had not been thawing, she was recognized by reporters at Shanghai Hongqiao International Airport, and under the pressure of the authorities, she had to give up acting the movie. Her role was replaced by mainland actress Pan Hong.

Two-thirds of the film was shot on location in the United States. The film wrapped in May 1989.

Release
The film was released on 23 December 1989 in South Korea and received negative reviews.

References

External links
 
 
 

1989 films
1980s Mandarin-language films
1980s English-language films
Chinese drama films
Films directed by Xie Jin
Films about prostitution in the United States
Films based on Chinese novels
Films set in the Republic of China (1912–1949)
Films set in Shanghai
Films set in Jiangsu
Films set in Venice
Films set in Boston
Films shot in Shanghai
Films shot in the United States
Films shot in Venice
Foreign films set in the United States